The 2020 NBA playoffs was the postseason tournament of the National Basketball Association's 2019–20 season. The playoffs were originally scheduled to begin on April 18. However, the league suspended the season on March 11, 2020, hours after the COVID-19 outbreak was declared a pandemic by the World Health Organization and after Utah Jazz center Rudy Gobert tested positive for the virus.

On June 4, the NBA Board of Governors approved a plan to restart the season on July 31 in the NBA Bubble. This proposal was then approved by members of the National Basketball Players Association on June 5. Under this plan, the 22 top teams in the league at the time of the suspension (all the teams who had a mathematical chance at making the playoffs under the 82-game season) played eight additional regular season games to determine playoff seeding, with 16 of those teams playing in a conventional postseason tournament. If the ninth seed within a conference would have finished the regular season within four games of the eighth seed, they would have then competed in a play-in series. The last time a play-in game was played to determine a playoff spot was in 1956.

As part of the bubble, all playoff games were held at the ESPN Wide World of Sports Complex inside Walt Disney World in Bay Lake, Florida.

All three games that were scheduled to take place on August 26 were postponed by a wildcat strike, in response to the shooting of Jacob Blake in Kenosha, Wisconsin, with the Milwaukee Bucks being the first team not to take the court prior to their game five matchup against the Orlando Magic. The games on August 27 and 28 were also postponed, with games resuming on August 29.

The Toronto Raptors were defending champions, but lost in the Eastern Conference Semifinals round to the Boston Celtics. None of the teams that made it to the Conference Finals in the 2019 NBA playoffs made the Conference Finals in 2020. These were the first playoffs since 1997 without the San Antonio Spurs, as they were eliminated from playoff contention on August 14, 2020, ending what was then the longest active playoff streak in the NBA and in the four major sports leagues in North America.

Overview
The Houston Rockets entered their eighth consecutive postseason.
The Portland Trail Blazers entered their seventh consecutive postseason.
The Toronto Raptors entered their seventh consecutive postseason.
The Boston Celtics entered their sixth consecutive postseason.
The Milwaukee Bucks entered their fourth consecutive postseason.
The Los Angeles Lakers made the playoffs for the first time in seven years.
The Dallas Mavericks made the playoffs for the first time in four years.
The Golden State Warriors missed the playoffs for the first time in eight years.
The San Antonio Spurs missed the playoffs for the first time in twenty-three years. This was only the fifth time since the merger that the Spurs missed the playoffs. With their 22-year playoff streak snapped, the Pittsburgh Penguins of the National Hockey League now owned the longest active playoff streak in any of the four major North American sports leagues.
This was the first time since 1997 that a team from the Western Conference with a losing record, Portland, qualified for the playoffs.
This was the first time since 2003 that both No. 1 seeds (the Milwaukee Bucks and the Los Angeles Lakers) from each conference lost their opening game of the playoffs.
LeBron James became the first player with 20+ points, 15+ rebounds, and 15+ assists in an NBA playoff game.
The Boston Celtics swept the Philadelphia 76ers in the first round, marking the 44th straight year a sweep occurred in the NBA playoffs. The last year a sweep did not occur in the playoffs was 1976.
The Toronto Raptors swept the Brooklyn Nets, making it their first series sweep in franchise history, leaving the Los Angeles Clippers and the Minnesota Timberwolves as the only two teams remaining that had never swept a series in the playoffs.
Donovan Mitchell and Jamal Murray joined Michael Jordan and Allen Iverson as the only players to have multiple 50-point games in a single playoff series.
This was the first time in NBA playoff history that two players on opposing teams (Donovan Mitchell of the Utah Jazz and Jamal Murray of the Denver Nuggets) tallied 50+ points in the same game.
Luka Dončić joined Charles Barkley and Oscar Robertson as the only players with 40+ points, 15+ rebounds, 10+ assists in an NBA playoff game.
Luka Dončić joined Michael Jordan, LeBron James, Kawhi Leonard, and Damian Lillard as the only players to score 40+ points and hit a buzzer-beater in a playoff game.
The Milwaukee Bucks were the first team in the playoffs to refuse to play a game over racial injustice in the wake of the shooting of Jacob Blake in Kenosha, Wisconsin. The players described their actions as a "boycott", although commentators have pointed out that the event was a strike. It is the first time an NBA team refused to play a game since the Boston Celtics protested for racial justice in 1961.
Kawhi Leonard was the first player to have 30+ points, 10+ rebounds, 5+ assists and 5+ steals in a playoff game since Gary Payton in 2000.
The Nuggets-Jazz series was the first of the 2020 playoffs to have a Game 7, making it the 21st consecutive NBA postseason with a Game 7. The last time a Game 7 did not take place in the playoffs was 1999.
Jamal Murray was the first player to have three straight playoff games with 40+ points since Allen Iverson in 2001.
The Denver Nuggets became just the 12th team in NBA history to come back from a 3–1 series deficit, when they defeated the Utah Jazz in the Western Conference first round. They were the first team to come back from a 3–1 series deficit since the Cleveland Cavaliers did so in the 2016 NBA Finals.
Game 2 between the Miami Heat and Milwaukee Bucks was the first playoff game since Game 1 of the 1979 NBA Finals to be decided by free throws with time expired.
This was the first time that the top two seeds in a conference (the Milwaukee Bucks and the Toronto Raptors in the East) were both down 0–2 in a best of 7 series.
Luguentz Dort became the youngest player and first undrafted player to score 30+ points in a Game 7.
This was the first time since 2013 that the fifth seed (Miami Heat) beat the first seed (Milwaukee Bucks) 4–1 in the Conference Semifinals.
Despite all the games being in the same location, the Celtics-Raptors series was the first series in NBA history where the (designated) road team won every game of a best-of-seven series. The only other time when this had happened in major North American sports leagues history was the 2019 World Series.
This was the first time that neither the first seed nor the second seed were in the Eastern Conference Finals. By coincidence, this would happen again the very next year.
This was the first time that an NBA team (Denver Nuggets) overcame a 3–1 deficit twice in the same playoffs.
Tyler Herro set the NBA rookie Conference Finals scoring record by scoring a career-high 37 points off the bench in game 4 of the Eastern Conference Finals against the Boston Celtics. The record was previously held by Andrew Toney who scored 35 in 1981. Herro's 37 points are the second-most ever scored by a player aged 20 or younger in a playoff game, only behind Magic Johnson's 42 points back in 1980.
The Miami Heat became the first 5th seed or lower team to advance to the NBA Finals since the New York Knicks in 1999.
This was the first time that both teams in the NBA Finals failed to make the playoffs in the previous season.
Andre Iguodala reached the NBA Finals for the sixth consecutive year, joining LeBron James and James Jones as the only players to do so with two different teams.
James became the second player (after Wilt Chamberlain in ) to win MVP with a franchise before later playing against that franchise in the Finals. James was the first Finals MVP to play their previous franchise in the Finals.
Anthony Davis joined Kevin Durant, Michael Jordan, Rick Barry, and Hal Greer as the only players in NBA History to score 30+ points in their first two career NBA Finals games.
Tyler Herro became the youngest player to start an NBA Finals game at 20 years, 256 days during the Game 2 of the 2020 NBA Finals on October 2, 2020. He was eight days younger than Magic Johnson was when he started Game 1 for the Lakers in 1980.
Jimmy Butler became the 3rd player in NBA History to record a 40+ point triple-double in the NBA Finals, joining LeBron James in 2015 and Jerry West in 1969. At the end of Game 3 of the NBA Finals, Butler also became the first player (opponent or teammate) to out-score/-rebound/-assist/ LeBron James in a Finals game.
LeBron James became the first NBA player to win the Finals MVP with three different teams.
Despite the Phoenix Suns going a perfect 8–0 in the bubble, they still missed out due to the Grizzlies defeating the Bucks and the Blazers defeating the Nets earlier in the day.

Format

After the NBA suspended its season on March 11, 2020, due to the COVID-19 pandemic, the league started to explore implementing a special postseason format just for this year.

On June 4, the NBA Board of Governors approved a plan to restart the season on July 31 in the NBA Bubble, with 22 of the 30 teams in the league, all clubs within six games of a playoff spot. Under this plan, the 22 teams played eight regular-season "seeding" games. A possible best-of-three play-in series for the final seed in each conference would then be held if the ninth seed finished the regular season within four games of the eighth seed. The eighth seed would start with a de facto 1–0 lead, meaning that it would need just one win to advance, while the ninth seed must win two in a row. The NBA's regular playoff format proceeded as normal. All games were played behind closed doors at the ESPN Wide World of Sports Complex in Walt Disney World.

Under the NBA's regular playoff format, the eight teams with the most wins in each conference qualified for the playoffs. The seedings were based on each team's record. Each conference's bracket was fixed; there was no reseeding. All rounds were best-of-seven series; the series ended when one team won four games, and that team advanced to the next round. All rounds, including the NBA Finals, were in a 2–2–1–1–1 format. In the conference playoffs, home court advantage went to the higher-seeded team (number one being the highest), although since all games were played in the same location, this was merely a designated home court. Seeding was based on each team's regular season record within a conference; if two teams had the same record, standard tiebreaker rules were used. Conference seedings were ignored for the NBA Finals: Home court advantage went to the team with the better regular season record, and, if needed, ties were broken based on head-to-head record, followed by intra-conference record.

Playoff qualifying
On February 23, 2020, the Milwaukee Bucks became the first team to clinch a playoff spot. The Toronto Raptors, Los Angeles Lakers, and Boston Celtics subsequently clinched playoff berths before the season was suspended on March 11.

Eastern Conference

Western Conference

Bracket
Teams in bold advanced to the next round. The numbers to the left of each team indicate the team's seeding in its conference, and the numbers to the right indicate the number of games the team won in that round. The division champions are marked by an asterisk.

First Round 
Note: All times are EDT (UTC−4) as listed by the NBA. All games were played behind closed doors at the ESPN Wide World of Sports Complex in Walt Disney World.

Eastern Conference First Round

(1) Milwaukee Bucks vs. (8) Orlando Magic 

Milwaukee was the first team in the league to refuse to play a game for social justice following the shooting of Jacob Blake.

This was the second playoff meeting between the two teams, with the Bucks winning the first meeting.

(2) Toronto Raptors vs. (7) Brooklyn Nets 

Toronto set an NBA playoff record in Game 4 with 100 bench points in a single game.

This was the third playoff meeting between these two teams, with the Nets winning the two previous meetings.

(3) Boston Celtics vs. (6) Philadelphia 76ers 

This was the 22nd playoff meeting between these two teams, with the Celtics winning 13 of the first 21 meetings.

(4) Indiana Pacers vs. (5) Miami Heat 

This was the fifth playoff meeting between these two teams, with the Heat winning three of the first four meetings.

Western Conference First Round

(1) Los Angeles Lakers vs. (8) Portland Trail Blazers 

Despite a losing effort, LeBron James had the first 20-point, 15 rebound, 15 assist performance in NBA playoff history.

This was the Lakers first playoff series win since 2012.

Game 5 was postponed by the league after the Lakers and Trail Blazers refused to play.

This was the 12th playoff meeting between these two teams, with the Lakers winning nine of the first eleven meetings.

(2) Los Angeles Clippers vs. (7) Dallas Mavericks 

Dončić's 42 points are the most points in a playoff debut. Following the game, many people, including LeBron James and current Kansas City Chiefs quarterback Patrick Mahomes, criticized the officials for controversially ejecting Porziņģis during the 3rd quarter after he received two technical fouls that the critics considered "bogus".

Down by 1, Luka Dončić hit the game-winning 3 point buzzer-beater at the end of overtime. He becomes the youngest player to hit a buzzer-beater in the playoffs. His winning shot capped an incredible triple-double performance with 43 points, 17 rebounds, and 13 assists.

The Clippers set 5 franchise records in this game, including: most points scored in a playoff game, as well as most 3-pointers made in a playoff game, as they shot 22-of-35 from long range.

Kawhi Leonard became the first player since 2000 to have 30+ points, 10+ rebounds, 5+ assists and 5+ steals in a playoff game.

This was the first playoff meeting between the Clippers and the Mavericks.

(3) Denver Nuggets vs. (6) Utah Jazz 

Mitchell's 57 points became the third most points scored in a single playoff game.

This was the first playoff game in NBA history in which two players scored 50 points.

Denver became the 12th team in NBA history to come back from a 3–1 deficit. Nikola Jokić scored the go-ahead hook shot with 27.8 seconds remaining in regulation. Mike Conley Jr.'s potential series-winning three-pointer at the buzzer rimmed out.

This was the fifth playoff meeting between these two teams, with the Jazz winning three of the first four meetings.

(4) Houston Rockets vs. (5) Oklahoma City Thunder 

Game 5 was postponed by the league following a boycott by the Rockets and Thunder.

This was the ninth playoff meeting between these two teams, with the Thunder/SuperSonics winning six of the first eight meetings.

Conference Semifinals 
Note: All times are EDT (UTC−4) as listed by the NBA. All games were played behind closed doors at the ESPN Wide World of Sports Complex in Walt Disney World.

Eastern Conference Semifinals

(1) Milwaukee Bucks vs. (5) Miami Heat 

After being fouled by Giannis Antetokounmpo on a game-winning shot attempt as time expired in regulation, Jimmy Butler won the game for Miami with a pair of walk-off free throws. This marked the first time a playoff game had ended in such a fashion since Game 1 of the 1979 NBA Finals.

This was the second playoff meeting between these two teams, with the Heat winning the previous meeting.

(2) Toronto Raptors vs. (3) Boston Celtics 

Both teams discussed a boycott of Game 1, similar to the Milwaukee Bucks, in protest due to the shooting of Jacob Blake. The game was eventually postponed.

With 0.5 seconds on the clock and Toronto trailing by 2, Kyle Lowry threw a cross-court inbounds pass to OG Anunoby, who made a 3-point shot as the buzzer sounded to win the game for Toronto.

This was the first playoff meeting between the Raptors and the Celtics. This was also the first best-of-7 playoff series in NBA history where the road team won every game (and the second overall in North American sports history in addition to the 2019 World Series).

Western Conference Semifinals

(1) Los Angeles Lakers vs. (4) Houston Rockets 

This was the ninth playoff meeting between these two teams, with the Lakers winning five of the first eight meetings.

(2) Los Angeles Clippers vs. (3) Denver Nuggets 

This was the first time that an NBA team overcame a 3–1 deficit twice in the same playoffs, and the first time an NBA franchise did so twice in the same decade.

This was the second playoff meeting between these two teams, with the Clippers winning the previous meeting.

Conference Finals 

Note: All times are EDT (UTC−4) as listed by the NBA. All games were played behind closed doors at the ESPN Wide World of Sports Complex in Walt Disney World.

Eastern Conference Finals

(3) Boston Celtics vs. (5) Miami Heat 

This was the fourth playoff meeting between the two teams, with the Heat winning two of the first three meetings.

Western Conference Finals

(1) Los Angeles Lakers vs. (3) Denver Nuggets 

Anthony Davis scored 31 points, including a 3-point shot over Nikola Jokić at the buzzer, to give the Lakers a 2–0 lead in the Western Conference Finals.

This was the seventh playoff meeting between these two teams, with the Lakers winning the first six meetings.

NBA Finals: (W1) Los Angeles Lakers vs. (E5) Miami Heat 

Note: All times are EDT (UTC−4) as listed by the NBA. All games were played behind closed doors at the ESPN Wide World of Sports Complex in Walt Disney World.

This was the first playoff meeting between the Lakers and the Heat.

Statistical leaders

Media coverage

Television
ESPN, ABC, TNT, and NBA TV broadcast the playoffs nationally in the United States. During the first two rounds, games were split between TNT, ESPN, and ABC regardless of conference. With the start of the playoffs delayed to August, some games played during the weekday afternoon, and games postponed by the wildcat strike, the TV schedule for the first two rounds differed from previous seasons due to scheduling conflicts. For instance, TNT aired some Friday games instead of its usual Sunday through Thursday schedule. Likewise ESPN broadcast games on some of those days when TNT would normally air them. And ABC aired a rare Tuesday night first-round game on September 1. NBA TV also televised selected games in the first round. Regional sports networks affiliated with the teams also broadcast the games, except for games televised on ABC.

The NBA Western Conference Finals aired exclusively on TNT, while ESPN televised the NBA Eastern Conference Finals. ABC owned the exclusive television rights to the 2020 NBA Finals, which was the 18th consecutive year for the network.

In Canada, the home market of the Toronto Raptors, national broadcast rights were split approximately equally between the Sportsnet and TSN groups of channels. Separate Canadian broadcasts were produced for all games involving the Raptors regardless of round or U.S. broadcaster.

References

External links

Basketball – Reference.com's 2020 Playoffs section

Playoffs
NBA playoffs
2020
NBA playoffs
NBA playoffs
NBA playoffs
NBA playoffs